Andrew Walter Gibson Scott (born November 15, 1967) is a Canadian musician born in Ottawa, Ontario and currently living in Toronto. His first bands include No Damn Fears and Oreo Reversed. Currently, Scott is a drummer with the Toronto-based band Sloan. Scott also plays guitar and occasionally sings lead vocals with the band, usually on songs he has written. Three of his songs, "500 Up" (included on the 1992 album Smeared), "People of the Sky", and "I've Gotta Try" (from the 2006 album Never Hear the End of It), have been released by Sloan as singles. Scott is married to actress and writer Fiona Highet. They have two children—a daughter, Stirling, and a son, Alistair.

Once the holder of several provincial track and field records, Scott abandoned his athletic aspirations to become a visual artist. After attending the Nova Scotia College of Art & Design University, he joined Chris Murphy, Jay Ferguson, and Patrick Pentland in Sloan.

References

External links 
Sloan official website

Canadian rock drummers
Canadian male drummers
Canadian rock guitarists
Canadian male guitarists
Canadian songwriters
Canadian people of British descent
1967 births
Living people
Musicians from Ottawa
Musicians from Halifax, Nova Scotia
Canadian indie rock musicians
Canadian alternative rock musicians
NSCAD University alumni
Murderecords
Alternative rock drummers
Sloan (band) members